Brian Murphy, K.C. (born March 17, 1961) is a former mayor of Moncton from 1998 to 2004, and was the Liberal Member of the House of Commons of Canada for Moncton—Riverview—Dieppe from 2006 to 2011. After his term as mayor, he was succeeded by Lorne Mitton.

Murphy was born in Moncton, New Brunswick. His family has produced several politicians, including his cousin Mike Murphy, the former Liberal MLA of Moncton North. Murphy was elected mayor in 1998, defeating the incumbent Leopold Belliveau, and was acclaimed for re-election in 2001.  He did not contest the 2004 municipal election.  Prior to being elected mayor, he served on city council from 1992 to 1998.  He was first elected to parliament in the 2006 federal election where he succeeded Claudette Bradshaw.

In the leadership election called to replace Paul Martin as leader of the Liberal Party, he supported Bob Rae.

Murphy was re-elected in the 2008 federal election. In the 2011 election, he was defeated by Conservative Robert Goguen.

Federal election results

References

External links

1961 births
Liberal Party of Canada MPs
Living people
Mayors of Moncton
Members of the House of Commons of Canada from New Brunswick
21st-century Canadian politicians